The seventh series of the BBC family sitcom My Family was originally broadcast between 6 April 2007 and 26 December 2007. It was commissioned following consistently high ratings from the sixth series. The opening episode, "The Ego Has Landed", re-introduces the seven main characters. All episodes from the seventh series are thirty minutes in length, with the exception of the Christmas special. The series was once again produced by Rude Boy Productions, a company that produces comedies created by Fred Barron. The series was filmed at Pinewood Studios near London, in front of a live audience.

Episode information

Reception

Viewers
The series was once again given a prime-time Friday evening slot, with most episodes broadcast at 8:30pm. No episodes in the series managed to attract over 6.8 million viewers, a considerable loss compared to previous series.

The final episode of the series, "Life Begins at Fifty", was moved back a week due to international football, losing around 1.5 million viewers.

The seventh series averaged 5.92 million viewers for each episode.

Critics
Tom Simpson, of My Family Online, thought that one particular episode from the series sood out. He wrote that "One of the Boys", written by the friend of Jason, David Cantor, is a "brilliant, lively, funny episode that also contains a rare moment of emotion", and that the episode brought a tear to his eye.

References

External links
My Family: Series Seven at the British Comedy Guide
My Family: Series Seven at My Family Online
BBC Comedy- My Family Series 7

2007 British television seasons